The fifth season of the long-running Australian medical drama All Saints began airing on 5 February 2002 and concluded on 26 November 2002 with a total of 43 episodes.

Plot 
2002 begins with a bang as an earthquake rips through Sydney, causing Von to fracture her arm and a train derailment. When Ben, Rebecca, and Scott arrive at the scene, they are horrified to discover Bron and Lyle among the victims.

Nelson reveals that he is an alcoholic to one of his patients before attending Alcoholics Anonymous meetings while Paula lets drop that she has a son. Rumours circle around Ward 17 that Von is sleeping with one of her patients, and later that both Terri & Mitch and Scott & Matt are having illicit affairs. Bron leaves the Ward for London for ten weeks, while wonder-doc Charlotte Beaumont joins the medical team, firstly helping with an Ebola patient.

The second half of the year commences with Terri revealing the bombshell the Ward has been waiting to hear: she is pregnant with Mitch's child, but tragedy soon strikes putting both mother and child in grave danger. Jared is forced to deal with terrible memories after he is raped by a drug-addled psychopath and Von must help Jared when he discovers he has contracted gonorrhea. Bron informs Ben that she had an affair in London and they break up, forcing Ben into the arms of Paula. In a bid to make Ben jealous, Bron sleeps with Charlotte.

The year comes to a conclusion with Mitch popping the question, Bron & Ben back together, and Paula & Luke developing feelings for one another.

Cast

Main 
 Georgie Parker as Terri Sullivan
 Conrad Coleby as Scott Zinenko
 Martin Lynes as Luke Forlano
 Tammy Macintosh as Charlotte Beaumont (24 episodes, from episode 16)
 Judith McGrath as Von Ryan
 Libby Tanner as Bronwyn Craig
 Ben Tari as Jared Levine
 Erik Thomson as Mitch Stevens
 Brian Vriends as Ben Markham

Recurring 
 Jenni Baird as Paula Morgan
 Natasha Beaumont as Rebecca Green (36 episodes)
 Josh Quong Tart as Matt Horner (37 episodes)
 Ling-Hsueh Tang as Kylie Preece (32 episodes)
 Paul Tassone as Nelson Curtis
 Rochelle Whyte as Cara Windom (19 episodes)
 Chris Haywood as Peter Buchanan (13 episodes)
 Richard Wilson as Adam Finch (9 episodes)
 Joy Smithers as Rose Carlton Stevens (8 episodes)
 Jack Rickard as Max Morgan (8 episodes)
 David Downer as Colin Blackburn (7 episodes)
 Celia Ireland as Regina Butcher (4 episodes)

Guest 
 Camilla Ah Kin as Hana Lawson (4 episodes)
 Kate Fischer as Hannah Laughlin (3 episodes)
 Patrick Thompson as Paul Stevens (3 episodes)
 Penne Hackforth-Jones as Dr Nicola Hartley (3 episodes)
 Belinda McClory as Nicola Lewis (2 episodes)
 Robert Coleby as Prof. Richard Craig (2 episodes)
 Rohan Nichol as Aaron Collingwood (2 episodes)
 Genevieve O'Reilly as Leanne Curtis (2 episodes)
 Nick Flint as Angus Drummond (2 episodes)
 Linda Cropper as Anita Murphy (1 episode)
 Ben Barrack as Vincent Soames (1 episode)
 Andrea Moor as Liz Thomas (1 episode)
 Victoria Longley as Margaret O'Brien (1 episode)

Episodes

DVD release

References

General
 Zuk, T. All Saints Series 5 episode guide, Australian Television Information Archive. Retrieved 15 July 2008.
 TV.com editors. All Saints Episode Guide - Season 5, TV.com. Retrieved 15 July 2008.

Specific

All Saints (TV series) seasons
2002 Australian television seasons